Podgorny is a rural locality (a khutor) in Tryasinovskoye Rural Settlement, Serafimovichsky District, Volgograd Oblast, Russia. The population was 33 as of 2010. There are 2 streets.

Geography 
Podgorny is located 38 km northeast of Serafimovich (the district's administrative centre) by road. Kepinsky is the nearest rural locality.

References 

Rural localities in Serafimovichsky District